Samaguri Assembly constituency is one of the 126 assembly constituencies of Assam Legislative Assembly. Samaguri forms part of the Kaliabor Lok Sabha constituency.

Members of Legislative Assembly 
 1951: Usha Borthakur, Indian National Congress
 1957: Usha Borthakur, Indian National Congress
 1972 :Bishnu Prasad , Indian National Congress 	
 1978 : Bhabendra Kumar Saikia, Janata Party
 1983 : Nurul Hussain, Indian Congress (Socialist)
 1985 : Abul Hussain Sarkar, Independent
 1991 : Nurul Hussain, Indian Congress (Socialist)
 1996 : Atul Kumar Sharma, Asom Gana Parishad
 2001 : Rakibul Hussain, Indian National Congress
 2006 : Rakibul Hussain, Indian National Congress 
 2011 : Rakibul Hussain, Indian National Congress 
 2016 : Rakibul Hussain, Indian National Congress
 2021 : Rakibul Hussain, Indian National Congress

Election results

2021 result

2016 result

References

External links 
 

Assembly constituencies of Assam
Nagaon district